RK may stand for:

Arts and entertainment

 Rajesh Khanna, Bollywood film actor
 Ram Kapoor, Bollywood film actor
 Reality Kings, a North American pornographic website
 Rurouni Kenshin, a manga series by Nobuhiro Watsuki

Science and technology
 Radial keratotomy, a surgical procedure on the eye
 Rhodopsin kinase, an enzyme
 RK 62 or RK 95 TP, Finnish assault rifles (RynnäkköKivääri)
 r/K selection theory, in biology, relating to the trade-off between quantity and quality of offspring
 Runge–Kutta methods, in numerical analysis

Other uses
 Raising Kaine, a defunct Virginia political blog
 Reichskommissariat, a historical Nazi territorial division
 Religious knowledge, also known as religious education
 Royal Khmer Airlines, ceased operations 2007 (IATA code RK)
 R Airlines, ceased operations 2018 (IATA code RK)
 Ryanair UK, UK based subsidiary airline of Ryanair (IATA code RK)

See also
 Kinner Airplane & Motor Corporation XRK-1, a United States Navy version of the Kinner Envoy aircraft
 Republic of Korea
 Republic of Kazakhstan